The Convention for the Lease of the Liaotung Peninsula, also known as the Pavlov Agreement, is a treaty signed between Alexander Pavlov of the Russian Empire and Li Hongzhang of the Qing dynasty of China on 27 March 1898. The treaty granted Russia the lease of Port Arthur (Lüshun) and permitted its railway to extend to the port (later South Manchuria Railway) from one of the points of the Chinese Eastern Railway (CER).

See also
Russian Dalian

References 

China–Russia treaties
History of Dalian
Treaties of the Qing dynasty
1898 in China
Treaties of the Russian Empire
China–Russian Empire relations